"Take My Breath Away" is a song by English singer-songwriter Emma Bunton. Written by Bunton, Steve Mac, and Wayne Hector, it was released on 27 August 2001 in the United Kingdom as the second single from Bunton's debut solo album, A Girl Like Me (2001). The single debuted and peaked at number five on the UK Singles Chart. The accompanying music video was shot in Sardinia, Italy, and was directed by Greg Masuak.

Track listings
UK CD and cassette single
 "Take My Breath Away"  – 3:38
 "Close Encounter" – 3:32
 "Take My Breath Away"  – 3:36

European CD single
 "Take My Breath Away"  – 3:38
 "Close Encounter" – 3:32

UK DVD single
 Emma introduces her new video
 "Take My Breath Away" 
 Emma introduces the song "Invincible"
 "Invincible" 
 Emma introduces the Tin Tin Out Mix
 "Take My Breath Away" 
 Message from Emma

Credits and personnel
Credits are taken from the UK CD single liner notes and A Girl Like Me booklet.

Studio
 Recorded and mixed at Rokstone Studios (London, England)

Personnel

 Emma Bunton – writing, vocals
 Steve Mac – writing, production, arrangement
 Wayne Hector – writing
 Mark "Spike" Stent – mixing
 Paul "P Dub" Walton – mixing engineer
 Chris Laws – engineering
 Ian Ross – artwork design
 Sam Harris – photography

Charts

Weekly charts

Year-end charts

Release history

References

2001 singles
2001 songs
Emma Bunton songs
Song recordings produced by Steve Mac
Songs written by Emma Bunton
Songs written by Steve Mac
Songs written by Wayne Hector
Virgin Records singles